Marlin is a city in Falls County, Texas, United States. The population was 5,462 at the 2020 census. Since 1851, it has been the county seat of Falls County. Marlin has been given the nickname "The Hot Mineral Water City of Texas" by the 76th Texas State Legislature. Mineral water was discovered there in 1892.

History

Establishment and Antebellum Era (1851–1861)

The low falls on the river southwest of present-day Marlin was the site of Sarahville de Viesca, established in 1834 by Sterling C. Robertson.

The act of the state legislature creating Falls County that passed on January 28, 1850 established Viesca (renamed Fort Milam) as the county seat. Citizens petitioned to choose their own location and a vote was held on January 21, 1851 that established the county seat at Adams, near the home of Dr. Allensworth Adams. On March 22, 1851, the Falls County commissioners court voted to rename Adams the "Town of Marlin" to honor former Robertson County alcalde John Marlin.

The new town of Marlin was laid out around a courthouse square and a log courthouse was constructed which also served as a school and church. In 1854 a new courthouse was constructed for $5,000, painted white with dark green shutters and a chrome yellow door.

In 1859, the population of Marlin was 2,875 whites; 1,225 slaves; 9 free blacks.

Early Schools 

The first schools in Falls County were private schools established at Marlin. A tuition school, Marlin Male and Female Academy, was located on Ward Street in 1871, north of the courthouse square. The school was renamed and relocated before finally being sold in 1886, only to be destroyed by fire in 1900. A new public brick school was constructed in 1903 and a high school was completed in 1917. The Marlin Independent School District was established in 1923. Nearly half a century before in 1875, two other schools for African Americans were organized. The two black schools were dependent on state funds, and met in the African and Baptist churches. In 1916, the city council voted to build a school for blacks; later, the Booker T. Washington High School was constructed in 1951 on Commerce Street and designed by the architectural firm of Thomas, Jameson and Merrill.  This school remains standing but is vacant. The two school districts merged in 1968 into the Marlin Independent School District. In 1900, the town's Jewish residents organized a Sunday school.

Reconstruction Era (1865–1877) 

The town of Marlin was formally incorporated by the state legislature on January 12, 1867. Two former slaves served as elected or appointed officials in Marlin: Nelson Denson and Lige Moore. The Houston & Texas Central Railway reached Marlin on 1871 as a stop on the "Waco Tap" line that extended northwest from Bremond (Robertson County) to Waco.  The location of the depot on the eastern side of the town led to the development of a commercial district eastward from the courthouse square along Live Oak Street.

In 1875, the 1854 courthouse burned and a new brick courthouse was constructed. The courthouse was badly damaged in a storm in 1886 and replaced with a new structure designed by architect Eugene T. Heiner.

The Mineral Water Era (1890s–1960s) 

In 1891, the City of Marlin issued bonds worth $25,000 to drill an artesian well.  Hot mineral water was accidentally discovered and later found to have medicinal properties. To harness the potential benefit of these "healing waters," the first bath house was constructed in 1895 with several others to follow. A least two of those early houses had large swimming pools with ornate covered buildings. Other bath houses were subsequently  constructed that included individual bathing areas with marble tubs, and cooling rooms with available massages for a full spa treatment. Thousands were soon attracted to Marlin to "take the cure."

While Marlin had a number of small hotels in the 19th century, the construction of the three-story Arlington Hotel in 1895 demonstrated the economic impact and potential of the mineral water industry.  The hotel and adjacent bathhouse burned in January 1899 but were both replaced with more elaborate structures that opened in 1901.  The new Arlington Hotel hosted notable community events, and statewide conventions. Other than the Hilton and the numerous boarding houses (such as Captain Bourrupt's and the Harris Houses) there were several other hotels, among them the Fannin, the Majestic and the Imperial, most, but not all, were on Coleman Street and within a few blocks of the public hot water fountain and the mineral water wells—on a sort of bath house row.

In 1929, Conrad Hilton began construction of a Hilton Hotel that was opened on May 27, 1930 at a cost of $375,000 and to which Marlin citizens and businesses contributed $50,000.  The nine-floor, 110-room hotel remains the tallest building in Marlin and was built on Coleman Street across from the Marlin Sanitarium Bathhouse which burned in the early 1990s. The hotel was connected to the bathhouse by a tunnel that has not been filled in but is inaccessible. Mr. Hilton's first venture into the hotel business that featured several hotels in Cisco, Mineral Wells, El Paso, and Marlin were not successful and Mr. Hilton sold those hotels in the 1930s. The Marlin Hilton was bought by the Moody’s of Galveston and later known as the Falls Hotel then bought by the Smithwick’s. It has been closed since the late 1960s as a hotel but parts of the first floor have held small businesses-beauty shops, an optometrist's office, an insurance agency, and restaurants. One such restaurant, the Cactus, occupied its space for about ten years until about 2016.  For many years the first floor ballroom also featured class reunions and school dances as well as public outside auction house usages. None of those businesses occupy the hotel at present. The hotel structure still stands but is unoccupied. In recent years sporadic renovations have occurred.

Along with the decline of the hot mineral water industry after World War II and the advent of penicillin, many of the bathhouse-related businesses closed and those older structures were gradually demolished or reconfigured. Most of the remnants of the bath house businesses had closed by the late 1960s. In the early 1980s a short-lived revival with some new bathing structures that did not succeed nor did one other attempt at that industry's revitalization in that 1990s. Only the Buie-Allen Hospital (c. 1912), now closed, and a very few former boarding houses remain as apartments, as well as some of the intact late-19th century commercial district and numerous early 20th century residences constructed by doctors and many others who served the bath house clientele. Hot mineral water can still usually be obtained from a fountain outside the Marlin Chamber of Commerce in the 1929 pavilion when the city maintains that access. The former location of the one of the several bath houses, the Sanitarium Bath House (burned down by accidental arson), is now a small city park featuring a gazebo that is adjacent to the old Houston & Texas Central railroad tracks. Those tracks are currently owned by the Union Pacific Railroad. The waters remain and there are at least three wells still active but are not accessible. The local three story Falls Community Hospital has heated (as of the 1980’s) its structure via the mineral water.
There is an active Falls County Historical Commission with an extensive museum. Adjacent to the museum there is a lively, active theater group—The Palace Theatre—that features plays and dinner-house productions as well as occasional outside professional entertainment.

Marlin as a Baseball Spring Training Site (1904–1918) 

Marlin's mild climate, hot mineral water baths and proximity by train to Dallas, Houston and San Antonio made it an appealing spring training location for Major League Baseball teams. Four different teams trained in Marlin from 1904 to 1918: the Chicago White Sox, St. Louis Cardinals, Cincinnati Reds and New York Giants. Players stayed at the Arlington Hotel, which is no longer standing.

In the same era, Marlin was home to minor league baseball. The Marlin Marlins (1916–1917) and Marlin Bathers (1923–1925) played as members of the Class D level Central Texas League and Texas Association.

Chicago White Sox (1904) 

The Chicago White Sox baseball team visited "Marlin Springs" from March 7 to March 17, 1904 as part of their spring training tour of the South.  The team's selection of Marlin can be credited to Ted Sullivan. The Chicago Tribune quoted Sullivan in an article published on February 7, 1904: "If I had looked the United States over for a spring training ground for a ball club, I do not believe I could have found a spot I would pick ahead of Marlin Springs ... [Charles] Comiskey asked me last December when I was coming to Texas to pick him out a place to train. I met a man in Dallas, who told me he left his crutches at Marlin; that he went there suffering with rheumatism. I took a run down to Marlin ... and I found the ideal spot for training grounds. The place has a magnificent hotel. Adjoining this place is a beautiful natatorium equipped with hot sulphur and all kinds of baths... The ball grounds here are on even surface and are only four blocks from the hotel. This is the spot I selected for the Chicago American league club..."  The White Sox left Marlin on March 17 "with expressions of regret and of hope that its individuals will be with the White Sox next spring when they return here for a similar stay." Among those on the White Sox who trained in Marlin was George Davis. On the last full day (March 16), Manager Nixey Callahan had the team make a ten-mile round trip walk to the Brazos River after dinner.

St. Louis Cardinals (1905) 

The St. Louis Cardinals chose "Marlin Springs" as their 1905 spring training site after delays in preparations of a site in Houston. As a result, the Chicago White Sox chose to train in New Orleans.  The Cardinals arrived in Marlin on March 6, 1905 and "a large gathering of local fans [were] on hand to welcome the big leaguers." Visits to the hot mineral water baths were a part of the team's daily routine.  A St. Louis newspaper reported that "[practice] ends at 4 o'clock and the players get to the bath about fifteen minutes later. The baths are hot, and it takes until 5 before the players are cooled off enough to go to the hotel, which is but a couple of steps distant. The baths not only put the players in first-class condition and remove any surplus weight, but they also tend to prevent soreness." The Cardinals broke camp at Marlin on March 17, 1905.

Cincinnati Reds (1906–1907) 

The Cincinnati Reds baseball team held spring training in Marlin in 1906 and 1907.

New York Giants (1908–1918) 

The New York Giants baseball team held spring training in Marlin from 1908 to 1918.

Modern utilities in Marlin
Phones began appearing in households in Marlin in the year 1900. Automobiles, electricity, and Lone Star Gas followed shortly. By the mid-1900s, Marlin had a bottling company, stock pens, a brickyard, a turkey-processing plant (building can still be seen on Williams Street/South Business Highway 6), a saddlery, a water crystallization plant, and a pottery plant.

The 2000s
The loss of major employers in the late 20th and early 21st centuries resulted in a loss of population and a reduction in the city's tax base. While at the census in 2000 Marlin had a population of 6,628 (a modest increase of 242 people from 1990), by 2010 the population had declined to 5,967 residents. According to the US and Texas census Marlin's largest population peaked at two times in its history, 1950 and 1980, with 7009 being its highest.

First to change hands or close was Swift turkey processing plant. Next was Marlin Mills, a carpet manufacturing company, closed during the 1980s economic decline. A styrofoam company, open in another building in Marlin's industrial park, caught fire and the remains were demolished. A dress manufacturing plant which catered to large businesses, such as the airline industry, closed. Wallace, a business form printing company employing hundreds, closed in the mid-2000s. In the early 2000s, 1100 small to medium-sized VA hospitals closed all over the US; one of which was The Thomas T. Connally Veterans Affairs Hospital, a five-floor building located at the corner of Ward and Virginia streets. The hospital closed in 2005, resulting in the loss of more than a hundred jobs, as the economy in Marlin continued to wane.

More recent investments include the construction of a three-floor, sixty-room Best Western Hotel on Highway 6, at Farm-to-Market Road 147. However, plans for the Texas Department of Criminal Justice to open a medical facility for prisoners at the former Veterans' Affairs Hospital, expected to add an additional 100 to 150 jobs to the Marlin economy, did not materialize. Funds were reallocated to renovate the TDJC hospital in Galveston, which was badly damaged by Hurricane Rita.

2011
The Heart of Texas Council of Governments granted the city of Marlin $35,000 to remove fifteen dilapidated buildings and structures in the town, which included 300 tons of debris. Over  of water lines were constructed on 20 streets in 2011. The city also started and completed a 500,000-gallon water tower project.

In 2011, the city brought back its Annual Music and Blues Festival, and raised money to revamp the city baseball fields and revive the City Little League, which attracted 160 children that year.

The city's crime rate decreased by 45 percent in 2011.

2015

On November 10, 2015, Marlin Chief of Police Darrell Allen died while in office. He had suffered a gunshot while at an off-duty security job in Temple on November 1. The suspect was placed into custody at the scene by other officers working security.

In December 2015 a protest occurred after the city water had been turned off for almost a week. It was determined that even after the city and the state had extensively renovated the water treatment system, the man who had worked for the city as the water systems manager instead of calling for repairs cut wires when alarms sounded instead of fixing the problem. The state found those dismantlings and disengaging of the systems when they removed panels to determine the problems. When the alarms sounded, that now former employee/manager just the cut wires so as not to have to listen to the alarms. This led to a city-wide water crisis that caused the water system to repair that extensive damage.

2019

On May 4, 2019, Marlin native Carolyn Lofton was elected as the first black woman to serve as mayor. She stated that she was motivated to run "on a desire to uplift and improve the community in which I live for all those who are currently here and those who seek to make a home here."

Geography

Marlin is located in east-central Falls County at  (31.307975, –96.892975). Texas State Highway 6 runs along the eastern edge of the city, leading northwest  to Waco and southeast  to Bryan. Texas State Highway 7 runs through the center of town as Bridge Street and Live Oak Street, leading east  to Kosse and west  to Chilton.

Transportation

Highways and other major roads
 Texas State Highway 6, also known as Williams, Craik Streets in city limits
 Texas State Highway 7, also known as Bridge, Live Oak Streets in city limits
 Farm-to-market road 147, starts at Highway 7 and ends at Highway 14 less than four miles southwest of Groesbeck

Airport

Demographics

As of the 2020 United States census, there were 5,462 people, 1,889 households, and 874 families residing in the city.

As of the census of 2000, there were 6,628 people, 2,415 households, and 1,509 families residing in the city. The population density was 1,465.4 people per square mile (566.2/km). There were 2,826 housing units at an average density of 624.8 per square mile (241.4/km). The racial makeup of the city was 41.84% White, 44.48% African American, 0.27% Native American, 0.20% Asian, 0.02% Pacific Islander, 11.62% from other races, and 1.58% from two or more races. Hispanic or Latino people of any race were 18.30% of the population.

There were 2,415 households, out of which 30.2% had children under the age of 18 living with them, 35.7% were married couples living together, 22.5% had a female householder with no husband present, and 37.5% were non-families. 34.8% of all households were made up of individuals, and 18.9% had someone living alone who was 65 years of age or older. The average household size was 2.47 and the average family size was 3.21.

In the city, the age distribution of the population shows 33.2% under the age of 18, 7.4% from 18 to 24, 21.3% from 25 to 44, 18.9% from 45 to 64, and 19.3% who were 65 years of age or older. The median age was 35 years. For every 100 females, there were 96.6 males. For every 100 females age 18 and over, there were 80.4 males.

The median income for a household in the city was $21,443, and the median income for a family was $26,861. Males had a median income of $25,220 versus $18,111 for females. The per capita income for the city was $13,555. About 27.9% of families and 31.3% of the population were below the poverty line, including 40.8% of those under age 18 and 16.8% of those age 65 or over.

Government and infrastructure

Municipal government

In December 2015 Damien Eaglin, then the acting police chief, was designated Marlin chief of police. He replaced Darrell Allen, who was shot and killed in November of that year.  Nathan Sodek was named chief in October 2018. He killed himself in September 2019 when Texas Rangers served him a warrant in connection of an investigation of sexual misconduct.

State government
The Texas Department of Criminal Justice (TDCJ) operates the Marlin Unit, a transfer facility for men, in the City of Marlin. The unit opened in June 1992 and was transferred to the Texas Youth Commission (TYC) in May 1995. When it was a part of TYC, the facility, named the Marlin Orientation and Assessment Unit, served as the place of orientation for children of both sexes being committed into TYC from the facility's opening in 1995 to its transfer out of TYC in 2007. In September 2007 the facility was transferred back to the TDCJ. The 2007 conversions of the Marlin unit, to house 600 adult prisoners, had the possibility of improving the economy of Marlin. Around that time Texas officials were examining the possibility of converting a former Veterans Administration medical center in Marlin into a prison unit for psychiatric patients.

The TDCJ also operates the William P. Hobby Unit, a prison for women located southwest of Marlin in unincorporated Falls County and named for former Lieutenant Governor Bill Hobby.

Federal government
The United States Postal Service operates the Marlin Post Office.

Education
The City of Marlin is served by the Marlin Independent School District.

Newspapers
The city of Marlin has had several newspapers. The current newspaper that has been serving Marlin since 1890 is the Marlin Democrat, issued every Wednesday. Another newspaper published in the 19th and 20th centuries was The Falls County Freeman, which served the African-American community. The Marlin Ball was established in 1874 by T.C. Oltorf and continued until about 1901. The Falls County Record was popular during the 1940s and 1950s. The Marlin Democrat and The Rosebud News remain the only active newspapers in Falls County.

Culture

Events
Marlinites have enjoyed the revival of the Marlin Music and Blues Festival since 2011 but has not been active at all since 2014. Originally the Wood Street Blues Festival from 2003 to 2005, the event was held in late May on consecutive days in honor of musician Blind Willie Johnson, a former resident of Marlin.

In May 2013, after a hiatus, the famous Marlin Festival Days returned to the city park but has long been closed.

Filmed in Marlin
Leadbelly (1976), starring Roger E. Mosley, was filmed on and around Wood Street in 1974.
Infamous (2006), starring Sandra Bullock, was filmed around Falls County Courthouse and unrestored homes of Marlin.
  Making New Family Memories in Rural Texas (2016), was filmed on and around 106 Tbd Cir in 2016.

Notable people

 Danario Alexander, wide receiver for the San Diego Chargers, was born in Marlin and graduated from Marlin High School in 2006
 Ken "Coach" Carter (second home), opened an unconventional boarding school in town in the fall of 2009 which has not been open for years and sits vacant
 Ben Clarkson Connally was appointed a federal district judge by President Harry Truman
 Tom Connally, U.S. senator, 1928–1952, was chairman of the Senate Foreign Relations Committee during World War II, and member of the U.S. House of Representatives, 1918–1928
 Bruce Curry, world champion boxer, was born in Marlin in 1956
 Alice Glass, 1911–1976, wealthy socialite and one of the many mistresses of Lyndon B. Johnson
 Bobbi Humphrey, jazz flautist and singer, was born in Marlin in 1950
 Blind Willie Johnson, blues/gospel street musician, had  Marlin as his attributed birthplace, although his birth records are lost; his birthplace has also been traced to Beaumont, Texas
 Dan Kubiak, state representative, graduated from Marlin High School in 1957
 Curtis Modkins, running backs coach for Chicago Bears, is a former offensive coordinator for the San Francisco 49ers
 O.L. Rapson was the first manager of the Grand Rapids Hotel and manager of a small store outside of Marlin
 Bob (Robert Jasper) Reeves (1892–1960) was a Western movie actor
 Ben Herbert Rice, Jr. Was a federal district judge appointed by President Harry Truman
 Phil Wellman, minor league baseball player and manager, is infamous for a tirade against umpires after ejection

Photo gallery

Climate
The climate in the area is characterized by hot, humid summers and generally mild to cool winters.  According to the Köppen climate classification system, Marlin has a humid subtropical climate, abbreviated "Cfa" on climate maps.

References

External links

 City of Marlin official website
 Marlin Chamber of Commerce

 
Cities in Texas
Cities in Falls County, Texas
County seats in Texas